The Bendola is a river that flows through the Alpes-Maritimes department of southeastern France. It is a left tributary of the Roya. Its source is in the Ligurian Alps, east of Saorge, near the border with Italy. It discharges into the river Roya near Saorge.

References

Rivers of France
Rivers of Alpes-Maritimes
Rivers of Provence-Alpes-Côte d'Azur
Rivers of the Alps